The EuroBasket 2017 Final was the championship game of the EuroBasket 2017 tournament. The game took place on 17 September 2017 in the Sinan Erdem Dome, Istanbul.

Slovenia, who defeated Spain in the semi-finals to reach the EuroBasket Final for the first time, met Serbia, the European runner-up from 2009, who defeated Russia in the semi-finals. Serbian team captain Milan Mačvan is the only player who played EuroBasket 2009 Final. Behind 35 points from Goran Dragić, who had announced his retirement from international play prior to the tournament, Slovenia won the final 93–85 and clinched their first ever EuroBasket championship.

It was the first EuroBasket Final in which both head coaches came from the same country. Slovenian team head coach Igor Kokoškov was coaching against his home country of Serbia.

Road to the final

Match details
This game was the sixth time Slovenia and Serbia met at a EuroBasket tournament, including games in which Serbia played as the FR Yugoslavia. 
In the fourth quarter, Serbia led 82–80 with 3:30 minutes to go in the game. Slovenia went on a 12–0 run Slovenian guard Goran Dragić scored 35 points on 12-22 shooting, which was the most points scored in a final since Pau Gasol with 36 in 2003. Following his performance, Dragić was given the Most Valuable Player award of the tournament after averaging 22.6 points in 9 games.

Slovenia won its first ever European title in surprising fashion, as odd makers favored Serbia and seven other teams over Slovenia to win the EuroBasket title. Slovenia finished the tournament 9–0 and thus unbeaten, which was the first time since  went 6–0 in 2003.

Rosters

Slovenia

Serbia

References

2017 in Istanbul
Final
2017
International basketball competitions hosted by Turkey
2017–18 in Turkish basketball
Sports competitions in Istanbul
Serbia national basketball team games
Slovenia national basketball team
Serbia–Slovenia relations
September 2017 sports events in Turkey